Latinxua Sin Wenz (also known as Sin Wenz "New Script", Zhungguo Latinxua Sin Wenz "China Latinized New Script", Latinxua "Latinization") is a historical set of romanizations for Chinese languages, although references to Sin Wenz usually refer to Beifangxua Latinxua Sin Wenz, which was designed for Mandarin Chinese. Distinctively, Sin Wenz does not indicate tones, under the premise that the proper tones could be understood from context.

Latinxua is historically notable as being the first romanization system used in place of Chinese characters by native Chinese speakers. It was originally developed by groups of Chinese and Russian scholars in the Soviet Union and used by Chinese expatriates there until the majority of them left Soviet Union. Later, it was revived for some time in Northern China where it was used in over 300 publications before its usage was ended by the People's Republic of China.

History and development
The work towards constructing the Beifangxua Latinxua Sin Wenz (北方話拉丁化新文字) system began in Moscow as early as 1928 when the Soviet Scientific Research Institute on China sought to create a means through which the large Chinese population living in the far eastern region of the USSR could be made literate, facilitating their further education.

This was significantly different from all other romanization schemes in that, from the very outset, it was intended that the Latinxua Sin Wenz system, once established, would supersede the Chinese characters. They decided to use the Latin alphabet because they thought that it would serve their purpose better than Cyrillic. Unlike Gwoyeu Romatzyh, with its complex method of indicating tones, Latinxua Sin Wenz system does not indicate tones at all.

The eminent Moscow-based Chinese scholar Qu Qiubai (1899–1935) and the Russian linguist Kolokolov V.S. (1896–1979) devised a prototype romanization system in 1929.

In 1931 a coordinated effort between the Soviet sinologists Alekseyev V.M., Dragunov A.A. and Shprintsin A. G., and the Moscow-based Chinese scholars Qu Qiubai, Wu Yuzhang, Lin Boqu, Xiao San, Wang Xiangbao, and Xu Teli established the Latinxua Sin Wenz system. The system was supported by a number of Chinese intellectuals such as Guo Moruo and Lu Xun, and trials were conducted amongst 100,000 Chinese immigrant workers for about four years and later, in 1940–1942, in the communist-controlled Shaan-Gan-Ning Border Region of China. In November 1949, the railways in China's north-east adopted the Latinxua Sin Wenz system for all their telecommunications.

In 1940, several thousand members attended a Border Region Sin Wenz Society convention. Mao Zedong and Zhu De, head of the army, both contributed their calligraphy (in characters) for the masthead of the Sin Wenz Society's new journal. Outside the CCP, other prominent supporters included Sun Yat-sen's son, Sun Fo; Cai Yuanpei, the country's most prestigious educator; Tao Xingzhi, a leading educational reformer; and Lu Xun. Over thirty journals soon appeared written in Sin Wenz, plus large numbers of translations, biographies (including Lincoln, Franklin, Edison, Ford, and Charlie Chaplin), some contemporary Chinese literature, and a spectrum of textbooks. In 1940, the movement reached an apex when Mao's Border Region Government declared that the Sin Wenz had the same legal status as traditional characters in government and public documents. Many educators and political leaders looked forward to the day when they would be universally accepted and completely replace Chinese characters. Opposition arose, however, because the system was less well adapted to writing regional languages, and therefore would require learning Mandarin. Sin Wenz fell into relative disuse during the following years.

For a time, the system was very important in spreading literacy in Northern China; and more than 300 publications totaling half a million issues appeared in Latinxua Sin Wenz. However:

In 1944 the latinization movement was officially curtailed in the communist-controlled areas [of China] on the pretext that there were insufficient trained cadres capable of teaching the system. It is more likely that, as the communists prepared to take power in a much wider territory, they had second thoughts about the rhetoric that surrounded the latinization movement; in order to obtain the maximum popular support, they withdrew support from a movement that deeply offended many supporters of the traditional writing system.

Description
Sin Wenz was designed so that every dialect had its own form of the alphabet. The letters below represent only one of the thirteen possible schemes present, the below form being Beifangxua Latinxua Sin Wenz: that for Northern Mandarin.

Much of Sin Wenz is similar to Pinyin in its orthography.

It is based upon the pronunciation outlined by the Commission on the Unification of Pronunciation, rather than upon the Beijing pronunciation (as with Hanyu Pinyin), hence the distinction between sounds such as gi and zi, or spellings such as yo and ung instead of ye or eng.

Initials

Key: Sin Wenz differs from Pinyin [IPA] (Pinyin)
Sin Wenz exhibits some interchangeability symbol for alveolo-palatal (j, q, x in pinyin) between g, k, x  with z, c, s.

Finals

Key: Sin Wenz differs from Pinyin [IPA] (Pinyin)
1e and ye is written as o and yo after initials g, k and x. For example: , 
2Standalone ui, un and ung are written as wei, wen and weng respectively.
3What is written as i (IPA ) after zh, ch, sh, r, z, c and s in pinyin is not written in Sin Wenz.

As in pinyin, spacing in Sin Wenz is based on whole words, not single syllables. Except for u, others syllables starting with u is always written with a w replacing the u. The syllable u is only preceded by a w when it occurs in the middle of a word. For syllables starting with i, the i is replaced by a j (in case of the syllables i, in and ing, preceded by a j) only in the middle of a word. Syllables starting with y is preceded by a j only when preceded by a consonant in the middle of a word. These are unlike pinyin, which always uses w and y regardless of the positions of the syllables. As in pinyin, the apostrophe (') is used before a, o, and e to separate syllables in a word where ambiguity could arise.

Irregular spellings
Because Sin Wenz is written without indicating tones, ambiguity could arise with certain words with the same sound but different tones. In order to circumvent this problem, Sin Wenz defined a list of exceptions: "characters with fixed spellings".

Telegrams sent by workers for the railways in the northeast of China switched from Zhuyin to Sin Wenz in 1950, then from Sin Wenz to Hanyu Pinyin in 1958; the 5 irregular spellings of 买 maai, 试 shii, 板 baan, 不 bu, and 李 lii, in use during the Hanyu Pinyin period, were inherited from Sin Wenz.

In addition, Sin Wenz also calls for the use of the postal romanization when writing place names in China, as well as preservation of foreign spellings (hence Latinxua rather than *Ladingxua).

Notes

References
 Norman, J., Chinese, Cambridge University Press, (Cambridge), 1988.
 Ni, X. (Ni, H.), Latinxua Sin Wenz Gailun (Lading hua xin wen zi gai lun), Shdai Chubanshe (Shi dai chu ban she), 1949.
 Milsky, C., "New Developments in Language Reform", The China Quarterly, No.53, (January–March 1973), pp. 98–133.
 Hsia, T., China’s Language Reforms, Far Eastern Publications, Yale University, (New Haven), 1956.
 Chen, P., "Phonetization of Chinese", pp. 164–190 in Chen, P., Modern Chinese: History and Sociolinguistics, Cambridge University Press, (Cambridge), 1999.
 Chao, Y.R., A Grammar of Spoken Chinese, University of California Press, (Berkeley), 1968.

External links
 Overview of Latinxua Sinwenz

Romanization of Chinese